In Search of a Character: Two African Journals is a slim volume, part travel book, part novelist’s journal, written by English author Graham Greene and first published in 1961.
Greene set two of his novels in Africa; A Burnt-Out Case, set in the Belgian Congo, and The Heart of the Matter, set in Sierra Leone. This book contains the journals, not originally intended for publication, that Greene kept on journeys he made for research purposes before writing those two novels.

The first part, Convoy to West Africa, covers his journey to Sierra Leone in 1941. The second part, Congo Journal, mainly deals with his journey to the Belgian Congo in 1959 and the people he meets along the way. He made the latter trip with the story of his 1960 novel A Burnt-Out Case already partly written and it is apparent he is searching for characters to populate that story. Greene fans often find this work interesting as a glimpse into the mind of the writer and of the man.

References

1961 non-fiction books
Books by Graham Greene
British travel books
The Bodley Head books
Books about Africa
Books about writing
English non-fiction books
African travel books